Bert James Weidner (born January 20, 1966 in Eden, New York) is a former professional American football player who played guard/center for six seasons for the Miami Dolphins. Daughters Molly and Maggie Weidner. Nephew Alex. Brother Willy.

1966 births
Living people
People from Eden, New York
Players of American football from New York (state)
American football offensive guards
American football centers
Kent State Golden Flashes football players
Miami Dolphins players